Places and things commonly known as Doffing or doffing include:
Doffing, Texas
a hat tip, i.e. doffing one's hat
the actions of:
 a doffer
 a doffing cylinder